Thrikariyoor is a village in Nellikuzhi panchayath in Ernakulam district in the Indian state of Kerala. Thrikkariyoor Mahadeva Temple is nearby.

Demographics
 India census, Thrikkariyoor had a population of 14424 with 7125 males and 7299 females.

References

Villages in Ernakulam district